Saint Claret College, Ziro (SCCZ) is a Catholic undergraduate college established in the Himalayan foothills at Ziro, Arunachal Pradesh, India. Founded in 2003, SCCZ is served by Claretian Missionaries, a Roman Catholic Order founded by St. Anthony Mary Claret and that serves in 64 countries. Saint Claret College at Ziro is permanently affiliated to Rajiv Gandhi Central University, Itanagar. SCC is recognized by the University Grants Commission (UGC) and is accredited with "A" Grade by the National Assessment and Accreditation Council (NAAC), Bangalore. SCCZ offers Bachelor of Arts, B. A. (Mass Communication), and B. Com, besides several certificate courses.

Origins
Saint Claret College was established in 2003 in response to the urgent need for institutes of higher education in the state of Arunachal Pradesh. As of 2001, there were only seven government colleges for the whole state. In response to the expressed desire of the people of Ziro Valley, Claretian Missionaries set up the college under the registered society, Claretian Formation Association of North East India, at the 20-acre land donated by the Apatani tribe at Salaya, 3.5 km from Old Ziro. The first batch consisted of 13 students.

Growth
The College currently offers B. Com, B. A. in Mass Communication, and B. A. in seven general disciplines, viz., Anthropology, Economics, Education, English, Geography, History, and Political Science. Majors are offered in all disciplines. Claretines (as the students of SCCZ are known) have consistently bagged the top ranks at the parent university, and SCCZ has won the best performing private college award. Currently, the college has a strength of 650 students and 30 faculty. SCCZ provides residential facilities that can provide on-campus accommodation for 200 female students as part of its commitment to higher educational empowerment of women.

Scholarships
The Single Step Foundation USA provides 50 annual academic scholarships for deserving female students, as part of its commitment for the educational empowerment of women. Grace EduCare, USA, ensures financial support for 5to 7 students for the entire duration of their undergraduate studies. Besides the scholarship, SCCZ offers endowment prizes for academic excellence in various categories. The tribal students of the College are eligible for the APST (Arunachal Pradesh Scheduled Tribe) Stipend, offered by the State Government.  Several Claretines receive the SJVN Silver Jubilee Merit Scholarships for the duration of their undergraduate studies by SJVN Ltd., a mini-ratna and Schedule 'A' central public sector undertaking of the Ministry of Power   as well as the Ishan Uday Scholarship of UGC.

Certificate courses
Besides the regular academic program, the college also offers several certificate programs. They include Diplomas in Computer Applications, Communicative English, Personality Development, Short Film Production, Tourism Management, Basics of Research Methodology, Organic Farming, Creative Writing & Theatre, Archaeology, Panchayati Raj Institution, Personal Financial Planning, and Skills for Conflict Transformation. The college has a fully functional Language Lab for improving English language skills. SCCZ also offers specialised training for Civil Service Examinations.

Associations
SCCZ has the following associations: St Claret Art & Literary Endeavor (SCALE), Claretine Association for Social Action (CASA), Sports & Games Association (SAGA), Claretine Youth for Christ (CYC), and Departmental Associations. The College also has an actively functioning NSS unit which has won awards at the State and the National levels. The College has consistently won the "Discipline Award" at the Inter-College Youth Festival of Rajiv Gandhi University, Itanagar. In 2003, SCCZ established People Education and Social Empowerment Center (PESEC) with the motto, "Excellence of the Masses." Through PESEC, SCCZ offers diverse training workshops for schools and colleges, computer literacy, social awareness campaigns and seminars.

IGNOU Center
St Claret College serves as an active Center for select courses offered by the Indira Gandhi National Open University.

InterViews: An Interdisciplinary Journal in Social Sciences
In 2014, Saint Claret College, Ziro became the first undergraduate school in the state of Arunachal Pradesh to publish a peer-reviewed, international journal: The first issue of "InterViews: An Interdisciplinary Journal in Social Sciences"  (ISSN number: 2349-400X). InterViews is a registered member of Crossref.  The Journal is currently supported with a partial grant from Indian Council of Social Science Research (ICSSR), Delhi.

Collaborations
SCCZ has signed MoUs with several other institutes of higher education for providing additional skilling for Claretines and to offer innovative programs.
 MoU with National Institute of Technology, Itanagar, for mutual exchange of faculty and student skilling.
 MoU with the National Institute of Social Communications, Research and Training (NISCORT) for skilling in Mass Communication.
 MoU with St. Claret College, Bangalore (SCCB)  for staff and student exchange programs.

Recognitions
In 2016, SCCZ became the first institute of higher education in Arunachal Pradesh to receive accreditation with Grade 'A' in the very first cycle. Currently, SCCZ is the only HEI graded "A" in Arunachal by National Assessment and Accreditation Council (NAAC), Bangalore.

On the 66th Republic Day, the State of Arunachal Pradesh announced a "Commendation Certificate" for Saint Claret College, Ziro, for its services to higher education in the State.
On 17 February 2015, at the XV Annual Conference of Higher & Technical Education, Government of Arunachal Pradesh, Saint Claret College, Ziro was conferred the Best NSS Unit of 2014 Award. This is the second time SCCZ has achieved this feat, first being in 2010. Mr. Tage Rangkha, a Claretine, was awarded Indira Gandhi NSS National Award in 2009-10. In 2019, SCCZ won the best performing private college award.

Vision 2020
The "Vision 2020: Innovate to Transform" has adopted Five Pillars of Excellence (Learner Centricity, Innovative Teaching-Learning, Educational Empowerment of Women, Community Service, Claretine Holistic Education Program) and Five Phrased Priorities (Professional Expansion, Infrastructural Development, Research, Publication, & Extension, Autonomy, and International Collaboration.

References

External links 
 SCCZ Website
 Journal InterViews
 Claretian Missionaries
 Claretians Northeast

Catholic universities and colleges in India
Universities and colleges in Arunachal Pradesh
Colleges affiliated to Rajiv Gandhi University
Lower Subansiri district
Educational institutions established in 2003
2003 establishments in Arunachal Pradesh
Claretians
Ziro